The Rose of Avalanche is an English alternative rock band from Leeds, West Yorkshire, England, formed in 1984. They have currently released ten albums.

History
The band was formed by Phil Morris, Paul James Berry and Alan Davis. The name came from the "rose" for the beauty and the "avalanche" for the power, as a way of describing their music.

Before they had played a gig they signed to local independent label LiL, and released two singles: "LA Rain" and "Goddess". Both made the Top 20 of the UK Independent Chart, with "LA Rain" also featuring in John Peel's Festive Fifty in 1985. 

After this initial success, Fire Records signed the band and the personnel changed. The "classic" line up was now Phil Morris, Paul James Berry, Glenn Schultz, Nicol McKay, and Mark Thompson. "Mass market" exposure came with the support slot on The Mission's 1986/87 World Crusade Tour. This line up released a further five singles and the first official studio album – Never Another Sunset in 1989.

Shultz and McKay left the band in 1989, and new bass player Darren Horner was recruited to replace McKay. This line up released one EP "A Peace Inside". Further personnel changes occurred in 1990 with Thompson leaving to be replaced by Andy Porter. The final line up then delivered one EP and two albums, String A Beads in 1990, and ICE in 1991. Before permanently breaking up, the band played live once more in 1993. The lineup consisted of Morris, Horner and Schultz plus a drum machine.

In September 2019, they announced that the band will be "reforming and (will be) playing at the Tomorrow's Ghosts Gothic and Alternative Festival, which is taking place at the Whitby Pavilion Saturday 25th April 2020."

Discography

Albums
Rose of Avalanche (1985), Contempo
First Avalanche (1986), Leeds Independent Label - UK Indie No. 3
Always There (1987), Fire
In Rock (1988), Fire - UK Indie No. 10
Anthology (1988), Fire
Live at Town and Country (1988), Contempo
Never Another Sunset (1989), Avalantic - UK Indie No. 10
String 'a' Beads (1990), Avalantic
I.C.E. (1991), Avalantic
LA Rain - The Singles Album (1997), Nectar Records

Singles, EPs
"L.A. Rain" (1985), Leeds Independent Label - UK Indie No. 10
"Goddess" (1985), Leeds Independent Label - UK Indie No. 16
"Too Many Castles In the Sky" (1986), Fire - UK Indie No. 8
"Velveteen" (1986), Fire - UK Indie No. 9
"Always There" (1987), Fire - UK Indie No. 3
Too Many Castles in the Sky/Velveteen double 7-inch EP Re-issue(1987), Fire
"The World Is Ours" (1988), Avalantic - UK Indie No. 8
"Never Another Sunset" (1989), Avalantic - UK Indie No. 19
A Peace Inside EP (1989), Avalantic
I Believe (1990), Rebel Rec

References

English alternative rock groups
English rock music groups